Omar Kedjaouer (born 22 July 1974) is an Algerian wrestler. He competed in the men's freestyle 52 kg at the 1996 Summer Olympics.

References

External links
 

1974 births
Living people
Algerian male sport wrestlers
Olympic wrestlers of Algeria
Wrestlers at the 1996 Summer Olympics
Place of birth missing (living people)
21st-century Algerian people
20th-century Algerian people